Max Anstie (born 25 April 1993) is a British professional Motocross and Supercross racer. Anstie finished in the runner-up spot in the SX2 class of the 2022 FIM Supercross World Championship. He is the reigning Australian Supercross champion in the SX2 class.

Anstie has competed extensively in both the FIM Motocross World Championship, as well as the American-based AMA Supercross Championship and AMA Motocross Championship. He is a six time grand prix winner in the MX2 class of the FIM Motocross World Championship, with his best championship position being third overall in 2015. 

Anstie has represented his country at the Motocross des Nations on several occasions, the most notable being the 2017 edition of the event, where he helped Great Britain finish third by taking two race wins and being the best overall individual rider in the event.  

His father, Mervyn, was also a world championship-level professional motocross racer.

Career

Junior career 
Anstie competed internationally throughout his junior career, first competing in the FIM Motocross Junior World Championship in 2006 (in the 85cc class), finishing sixth overall. The following year, Anstie was able to finish in the runner-up spot in the same class, with two-second places behind champion Ken Roczen. At the 2008 edition of the event he was able to win the opening race in the 85cc class, but did not finish the second race, to finish seventh overall with Jeffrey Herlings as the winner.

Move to America 
In 2009, Anstie made his professional motocross debut in the 250 class of the AMA Motocross Championship, riding a KTM. Riding in the first eight rounds of the championship he was able to record a best finish of sixth in race two at Red Bud. This effort as enough for Anstie to be signed by the DNA Shred Stix Star Racing Yamaha team for 2010, where he would make his professional supercross debut. Competing in the Lites West class, he recorded several top ten finished, including a fourth in San Diego.

World Championship career 
Following his results in America, Anstie was able to sign for the Team CLS Monster Energy Kawasaki Pro Circuit team in the MX2 class of the FIM Motocross World Championship in 2011. Anstie was immediately a factor in the MX2 class, placing in the top ten consistently and finishing third in the first race at the American round. He would come close to the overall podium several times throughout the year, before taking his first grand prix podium at the final round of the season in Italy. After sixth in the final standings, Anstie moved to the Honda Gariboldi team for 2012 As part of this deal, Anstie would race the first five rounds of the Lites West class in the AMA Supercross Championship in America for 2012. A best place of sixth in Los Angeles, combined with missing the final three rounds, left him 16th in the championship standings. Anstie would again have a consistent season in the MX2 class of the FIM Motocross World Championship finishing seventh in the final standings, picking up his second overall podium at Lierop in The Netherlands. He finished the year by making his debut for Great Britain at the Motocross des Nations at Lommel in Belgium. Anstie helped Great Britain finish eighth overall, with himself finishing sixth individually in the Open class.

For 2013, Anstie was signed by Suzuki's factory team in the MX2 class of the 2013 FIM Motocross World Championship. Once again, alongside this, Anstie competed in the opening rounds of that years AMA Supercross Championship in the Lites West class – at this point renamed to 250SX West. In the world championship, Anstie was not able to land on the overall podium during the season, but did pick up two third place race finishes. Anstie was on the move again in 2014, joining the BikeIT Yamaha Cosworth team, focussing on the MX2 class of the 2014 FIM Motocross World Championship. He showed an immediate improvement, running at the front of the first few rounds and picking up two overall podiums in a row at rounds two and three. Later in the season, at Lommel, Anstie was able to pick up his first race win en route to his first overall grand prix victory.

Anstie stayed with the same team for the 2015 FIM Motocross World Championship, which moved to Kawasaki. This proved to be his most successful season to date, finishing third overall in the championship behinds Tim Gajser and Pauls Jonass. Included within this was three grand prix wins and nine race wins as part of that. On the back of this, Anstie was selected to make his second start for Great Britain at the 2015 Motocross des Nations. Unfortunately, an injury sustained in the Saturday qualifying race ended his weekend. For the 2016 FIM Motocross World Championship, Anstie changed teams again, to return to being a factory rider – this time for Husqvarna. In what turned out to be a dominant season for champion Jeffrey Herlings, Anstie was able to pick up two more grand prix victories and finish in fourth in the final standings.

Anstie was retained by factory Husqvarna in 2017, but had to step up to the MXGP class for the 2017 FIM Motocross World Championship. Despite picking up a knee injury and missing two rounds, Anstie was able to pick up three overall podiums in his debut MXGP season on his way to ninth in the final standings. Once again selected to race for Great Britain at the Motocross des Nations, Anstie had a stand out weekend, winning both of his races to help his nation get its first podium since 1997. Despite an injury in the early part of the season, Anstie was able to pick up a further three overall podiums on the way to tenth in the MXGP standings of the 2018 FIM Motocross World Championship. This was coupled with another third overall as part of team Great Britain at the 2018 Motocross des Nations. In 2019, Anstie moved away from Husqvarna to the Standing Construct KTM team for MXGP. In a season shortened by injury, he was able to take his first and to date only race win in the MXGP class in Lommel. He missed out on the overall win or podium at the same round due to a crash in the opening race that caused a damaged lung. He was able to ride with this injury to win the second race, but could not compete in the remaining rounds of the year.

Return to America 
Struggling to find a ride in the world championship paddock, Anstie opted to return to America for the 2020 to compete in the AMA Supercross and AMA Motocross Championships. Signing for the HEP Motorsports Suzuki team, an injury would rule him out of the entire supercross season. In the Covid-19 shortened AMA Motocross season, Anstie would finish ninth in the final standings, grabbing a third place in race two at the second round after leading much of it. He remained with the same team for 2021, but had injury problems again that ruled him out of the first part of the 2021 AMA Supercross Championship.

For 2022, Anstie signed for the Rocky Mountain ATV/MC WPS KTM team. However, when the team lost its title sponsor mid-way through the supercross season, Anstie was left without a ride. Later in the year, Anstie signed for the Australian Fire Power Honda team. He made his debut for the team in the 450 class in the AMA Motocross Championship but his main focus of the year would be the Motocross des Nations and the 2022 FIM Supercross World Championship, dropping down to the 250 for both. The 2022 Motocross des Nations would be a tough event for both Anstie and the Great Britain team, with them finishing tenth overall. In world supercross, Anstie was able to finish second overall behind Shane McElrath, winning two races in the series along the way. This was followed up by him becoming Australian Supercross Champion in the 250 class.

Honours 
Motocross des Nations
 Team Overall: 2017  
FIM Motocross World Championship
 MX2: 2015 
FIM Junior Motocross World Championship
 85cc: 2007 
Australian Supercross Championship
 SX2: 2022

Career statistics

Motocross des Nations

FIM Motocross World Championship

By season

Grand Prix Wins

FIM Supercross World Championship

By season

AMA Supercross Championship

By season

AMA National Motocross Championship

By season

References

Living people
1993 births
British motocross riders